Helmut Pfleger (born August 6, 1943) is a German chess grandmaster and author. He was one of the most promising chess players in the 1960s and 1970s. From 1977 until 2005, Pfleger hosted a series of chess programs on German public TV, including Chess of the Grandmasters, often together with grandmaster Vlastimil Hort. By profession, he is a doctor of medicine.

Chess career 
In 1960 he won the German Junior Championship, in 1961 was fourth in the World Junior Chess Championship. In 1965 he tied for 1st with Wolfgang Unzicker in the German Chess Championship in Bad Aibling, but lost an additional match to him there.

He took 1st at Maputo 1973, tied for 1st–2nd at Polanica-Zdrój 1971, tied for 1st–2nd at Montilla 1973, tied for 2nd–3rd at Montilla 1974, tied for 2nd–5th at Manila 1975, tied for 2nd–3rd at Havana 1982, was 4th at Royan 1988.

Pfleger played for Germany in the Chess Olympiads of 1964, 1968, 1972, 1974, 1978, 1980 and 1982. At the Tel Aviv Olympiad of 1964, he was awarded the gold medal for best performance on fourth board and a bronze medal for his contribution to the team's overall performance. He was awarded the Grandmaster title in 1975.

On the April 2009 FIDE list, he has an Elo rating of 2477, although he has been virtually inactive since 1990.

Notable games 
 Helmut Pfleger vs Anatoli Karpov, Hastings 1971, Queen's Indian Defense: Classical, Main Line (E19), ½–½
 Helmut Pfleger vs Mikhail Tal, Tallinn 1973, Modern Defense: Queen Pawn Fianchetto (B06), ½–½
 Helmut Pfleger vs Bent Larsen, Manila 1974, English Opening: Great Snake Variation (A10), 1-0
 John Nunn vs Helmut Pfleger, Plovdiv ETC 1983, Pirc Defense: General (B07), ½–½

Bibliography

References

External links 
 
 Helmut Pfleger at 365Chess.com
 Rating data for Helmut Pfleger
 Books by Helmut Pfleger
 Chessmetrics Player Profile: Helmut Pfleger
 ChessBase.com – Chess News – Happy Birthday Helmut Pfleger!

1943 births
Living people
People from Teplice
Chess grandmasters
Chess Olympiad competitors
German chess players
German chess writers
German people of German Bohemian descent
German male non-fiction writers
Sudeten German people